Close at Hand is the second EP by James McCartney.

McCartney said of the EP, "There is only one thing to do with high expectations, and that is meet them.  I wanted to follow Available Light with something that showed a progression… that had an even deeper meaning, both spiritually and musically."

Track listing

Personnel 
James McCartney – vocals, electric guitar, acoustic guitar, bass, piano
Steve Bayley – guitar, keyboards, backing vocals 
Charlie Turner – bass, backing Vocals
Steve Isserlis – cello
Shawn Pelton – drums
 Roy Hendrickson – engineer

References

2011 EPs
James McCartney albums
ECR Music Group albums
Albums produced by David Kahne
Albums produced by Paul McCartney